Jerzy Wybieralski (born 8 September 1954 in Poznań) is a Polish former field hockey player who competed in the 1980 Summer Olympics.

He is a brother of Józef Wybieralski; uncle of Krzysztof Wybieralski; uncle of Łukasz Wybieralski.

References

External links
 

1954 births
Living people
Polish male field hockey players
Olympic field hockey players of Poland
Field hockey players at the 1980 Summer Olympics
Sportspeople from Poznań